"Love Goes On" is a song by the Australian indie rock group The Go-Betweens issued as the third and final single from their 1988 album 16 Lovers Lane. The song was released in January 1989 by Beggars Banquet Records in the UK, with "Clouds" as the B-side. "Love Goes On" was the last single issued by the band before their split in December 1989.

Reception
Thom Jurek in his review of 16 Lovers Lane at AllMusic describes the song as setting the stage "for a kind of refined yet primal emotional transference that pop music is rarely capable of revealing." "As he [McLennan] sings... ...the doorway to the heart and its secrets opens. In the grain of his voice lie the flowers in the dustbin whose names are desperation and affirmation. With its hyperactive acoustic guitars, Amanda Brown's cooing string arrangements, and the deftly layered, subtly played brass instruments, the tune becomes a gauzy anthem; it celebrates the ravaged heart as a beacon of strained hope in the entryway to a hall of bewilderment."

In the book, Lost in the Grooves: Scram's Capricious Guide to the Music You Missed, it states that "'Love Goes On' is either a literal story  of obsession or a metaphor for the transitory nature of love, driven by a cheery electric guitar line and a Spanish guitar break over strings, synths and God knows how many other instruments."

Track listing

7" Vinyl release

Release history

Credits
The Go-Betweens
 Amanda Brown – violin, oboe, guitar, vocals
 Robert Forster – vocals, rhythm guitar, harmonica
 Grant McLennan – vocals, lead guitar
 Lindy Morrison – drums
 John Willsteed – bass guitar, guitar, Hammond organ, piano

Production
 Mixing — Tony Visconti ("Love Goes On")
 Producer — Mark Wallis

References

External links
 "Love Goes On" @ AllMusic
 "Love Goes On" @ MusicBrainz
 "Love Goes On" @ Discogs

1989 singles
The Go-Betweens songs
1989 songs
Songs written by Grant McLennan
Songs written by Robert Forster (musician)